Saint-Philémon is a parish municipality of about 700 people in the Bellechasse Regional County Municipality in the Chaudière-Appalaches administrative region of Quebec.

Demographics 

References

See also 
Mount Chocolat

Parish municipalities in Quebec
Incorporated places in Chaudière-Appalaches